Big Bushkill Creek (Bush Kill on federal maps) is a  tributary of the Delaware River in the Poconos of eastern Pennsylvania in the United States.

It originates from Pecks Pond  in Pike County. It flows south, entering Pickerel Lake and then into Beaver Run Pond. Most of the stream travels through Delaware State Forest before entering Monroe County. It is a prominent feature of Resica Falls Scout Reservation.

Bush Kill joins the Delaware River at the village of Bushkill.

Tributaries

(There are at least five unnamed tributaries to the Bush Kill)
Little Bush Kill
Sand Hill Creek
Saw Creek
Spring Run
Pennel Run
Dancing Ridge Run
Utt Run
High Swamp Run
Sixteen Mile Run
Brights Creek
Beaver Run 
Middle Branch Bush Kill

See also
Bushkill Falls
List of Pennsylvania rivers

References

External links
U.S. Geological Survey: PA stream gaging stations

Rivers of Pennsylvania
Pocono Mountains
Tributaries of the Delaware River
Rivers of Monroe County, Pennsylvania